Nippononebria is a genus of ground beetles in the family Carabidae. There are about eight described species in Nippononebria.

Species
These eight species belong to the genus Nippononebria:
 Nippononebria altisierrae (Kavanaugh, 1984)  (Western United States)
 Nippononebria campbelli (Kavanaugh, 1984)  (North America)
 Nippononebria chalceola (Bates, 1883)  (Japan)
 Nippononebria changbaiensis Kavanaugh & Liang, 2010  (China)
 Nippononebria horioi Nakane, 1960  (Japan)
 Nippononebria pusilla (Ueno, 1955)  (Japan)
 Nippononebria sawadai Nakane, 1979  (Japan)
 Nippononebria virescens (G.Horn, 1870)  (North America)

References

Nebriinae
Articles created by Qbugbot